The Buffalo Bisons (known colloquially as the Herd) are a Minor League Baseball team of the International League and the Triple-A affiliate of the Toronto Blue Jays. Located in Buffalo, New York, the team plays their home games at Sahlen Field, the highest-capacity Triple-A ballpark in the United States.

The current Bisons organization was founded in 1979 and assumed the history of previous franchises that also used the Buffalo Bisons name, most notably the 1886–1970 Buffalo Bisons minor league franchise, and the 1879–1885 Buffalo Bisons major league franchise. The team established the Buffalo Baseball Hall of Fame in 1985 to honor former players, managers and contributors to baseball in Buffalo.

The team holds the all-time record for single-season attendance in Minor League Baseball, selling 1,240,951 tickets in 1991 while being considered for 1993 Major League Baseball expansion. Forbes valued the Buffalo Bisons at $34 million in 2016, making it the 15th-most valuable Minor League Baseball franchise.

History

Mayor James D. Griffin and an investment group purchased the Jersey City A's of the Double-A class Eastern League for $55,000 in 1978, and the team began play as the Buffalo Bisons at War Memorial Stadium in 1979. This new franchise assumed the history of prior Buffalo Bisons teams that had played in the city from 1877 to 1970. Robert E. Rich Jr. purchased the Bisons for $100,000 in 1983, and upgraded the team to the Triple-A class American Association in 1985 after buying out the Wichita Aeros for $1 million. Rich Jr. grew the team's popularity and was known for his innovative promotional tie-ins, most notably an annual series of post-game concerts by The Beach Boys.

The Buffalo Bisons moved to the $42.4 million Pilot Field (now Sahlen Field) in downtown Buffalo in the 1988 season. In their first year at the venue after moving from War Memorial Stadium, the Bisons broke the all-time record for Minor League Baseball attendance by drawing 1,186,651 fans during the 1988 season. The team won two division titles and set subsequent attendance records on the heels of their unsuccessful 1993 Major League Baseball expansion bid. The team's 1991 single-season attendance of 1,240,951 remains a Minor League Baseball record.

The Cleveland Indians replaced the Pittsburgh Pirates as Major League Baseball affiliate of the Buffalo Bisons prior to the 1995 season. The team won division titles in 1996 and 1997, and won the final American Association championship in 1997. Bartolo Colón threw the first no-hitter in franchise history on June 20, 1997 against the New Orleans Zephyrs.

In wake of the American Association disbanding following the 1997 season, the Bisons joined the International League in 1998. The team won the division and league championship in their first season, but lost the Triple-A World Series. The addition of regional rivalries allowed for the creation of the Thruway Cup, an annual competition between the Buffalo Bisons, Rochester Red Wings and Syracuse SkyChiefs. The Bisons went on to win division titles in 2000, 2001, 2004, 2005, and the league championship at home in 2004.

The New York Mets replaced the Cleveland Indians as Major League Baseball affiliate of the Buffalo Bisons prior to the 2009 season. This era was plagued with poor on-field performance and low attendance.

The Toronto Blue Jays replaced the New York Mets as Major League Baseball affiliate of the Buffalo Bisons prior to the 2013 season. To kick off this era, the Bisons scored 27 runs on 29 hits against the Syracuse Chiefs on April 18, 2013, setting records for the most runs and hits in an International League game since 1973. The Blue Jays used Sahlen Field as their home field in 2020 after the Bisons season was cancelled due to the COVID-19 pandemic, investing $5 million in upgrading the venue.

In conjunction with Major League Baseball's restructuring of Minor League Baseball and the closure of the International League, the Bisons joined the newly formed Triple-A East in 2021. Due to renovations at Sahlen Field as well as use of the stadium by the Blue Jays, the Bisons began their 2021 season at Trenton Thunder Ballpark in Trenton, New Jersey. At their home games, they wore the uniforms of the Trenton Thunder and were referred to as such while the Thunder MLB Draft League team was referred to as Draft League Thunder by the Thunder organzation; on the road, they were still known as the Buffalo Bisons while the Thunder MLB Draft League team was referred to as Trenton Thunder on the road.

The Bisons returned to the International League in 2022.

Roster

Alumni

Retired numbers

National Baseball Hall of Fame members

International League Hall of Fame members

Buffalo Baseball Hall of Fame members

All 25 Seasons Team (2012)

Season-by-season records

Radio and television

Bisons Baseball Network produces all radio broadcasts of Buffalo Bisons games. Their flagship station since 2009 has been WWKB, a clear-channel station in Buffalo. Select games are simulcast on WGR in Buffalo and CJCL in Toronto. Games were previously carried by WUFO/WXRL (1983), WEBR (1984), WBEN (1985–1988) and WGR (1989–2008).

MiLB.TV has aired live video streams of all Buffalo Bisons games since 2013. Select games have been televised on WNLO since 2019. Games were previously televised on WNYB (1988–1989, 1996), Empire Sports Network (1991–1995, 1997–2004), Time Warner Cable SportsNet (2007–2016) and Spectrum Sports (2017).

Pat Malacaro has served as the team's play-by-play announcer since 2018. Pete Weber served as play-by-play announcer from 1983 to 1995, and is the current play-by-play announcer for the Nashville Predators. Jim Rosenhaus served as play-by-play announcer from 1996 to 2006, and is the current play-by-play announcer for the Cleveland Guardians. Ben Wagner served as play-by-play announcer from 2007 to 2017, and is the current play-by-play announcer for the Toronto Blue Jays.

Duke McGuire has served as the team's color commentator since 1996, and previously worked as the team's in-stadium public address announcer from 1979 to 1995. John Murphy served as color commentator from 1985 to 1988, and is the current play-by-play announcer for the Buffalo Bills. Greg Brown served as color commentator from 1989 to 1993, and is the current play-by-play announcer for the Pittsburgh Pirates.

Weber, McGuire and Rosenhaus were inducted into the Buffalo Baseball Hall of Fame for their broadcast work.

Culture

Mascots

Donald Palmer was an acrobatic batboy who performed for the Buffalo Bisons as "The Butcher" from 1979 to 1988.

Earl Howze, Jr. was a beer vendor who performed for the Buffalo Bisons as "The Earl of Bud" from 1979 to 1997. He was known for dancing to the song "Tequila" atop the venue's dugouts, with a routine similar to the one made famous by Paul Reubens in the 1985 film Pee-wee's Big Adventure. The Buffalo Bisons honored him at an August 2012 game, with every fan in attendance receiving a bobblehead of his likeness. Howze, Jr. also performed for the Buffalo Sabres at Buffalo Memorial Auditorium.

Tom Girot is a beer vendor who has performed for the Buffalo Bisons as "Conehead" since 1979. The Buffalo Bisons honored him at a July 2018 game, with a beer launched in his likeness called Conehead IPA by Resurgence Brewing Company. Girot has also performed for the Rochester Red Wings at Frontier Field and the Toronto Blue Jays at Sahlen Field.

Buster T. Bison has been the official mascot of the Buffalo Bisons since 1983. He was later joined by his cousin Chip in 1994, and his future wife Belle in 2006.

Tracey B. Wilson was an actress who performed for the Buffalo Bisons as the mime "Loud Mouth" from 1993 to 1999.

Buffalo Bisons games since 2011 have featured the Wing, Cheese & Carrot (WCC) mascot race between costumed representations of various local foods just prior to the sixth-inning.

Music

"Stampede" has been the official fight song of the Buffalo Bisons since their inaugural season at Sahlen Field in 1988.

Tina Turner's recording of "The Best" is played after every Buffalo Bisons home victory at Sahlen Field.

A parody of the Gary Glitter song "Rock and Roll Part 2" featuring lyrics referencing Irv Weinstein was played at Sahlen Field during the seventh-inning stretch of Buffalo Bisons games in the 1990s.

References

External links

Official website

 
1979 establishments in New York (state)
Baseball teams established in 1979
Chicago White Sox minor league affiliates
Cleveland Guardians minor league affiliates
American Association (1902–1997) teams
Eastern League (1938–present) teams
International League teams
New York Mets minor league affiliates
Pittsburgh Pirates minor league affiliates
Toronto Blue Jays minor league affiliates
Triple-A East teams